Ernesto Sosa Valadéz (born March 1, 1962) is a Mexican football manager and former player.

References

External links

1962 births
Living people
Mexican footballers
Association football defenders
C.F. Oaxtepec footballers
Irapuato F.C. footballers
Correcaminos UAT footballers
Santos Laguna footballers
Atlético Morelia players
Mexican football managers
Footballers from Aguascalientes
People from Aguascalientes City